Kellersburg is an unincorporated community in Madison Township, Armstrong County, Pennsylvania, United States.

History
Kellersburg was founded in 1842 by Nicholas Keller, Sr. consisting originally of twenty-three lots, on both sides of the Olean 
road in the eastern part of the township
Keller sold his lots at $20 and $30 each, good prices for those days, retaining five-sixteenths of an acre for his hotel and store.

Red Bank post office was established May 13, 1842, C. Shunk, postmaster. 
On February 24, 1871 its name was changed to Kellersburgh, David Grant postmaster.
Its name was changed again to Kellersburg in 1894.
In 1913 A.M. Willison was postmaster, keeping the post office in his store.

Salem Evangelical Lutheran Church

Having been organized as far back as 1836 by Rev. G.A. Reichert, it is one of the oldest of the faith in the county.

The pastors from the beginning have been: Rev. G.A. Reichert, 1832–37; Rev. Henry D. Keyl, occasionally from 1838 to 1842; Rev. William Uhl, 1846–48; Rev. J.A. Nuner, 1849–51; Rev. Thomas Stock, 1851–54; Rev. George F. Ehrenfeld, 1854–55; Rev. Thomas Steck, 1856; Rev. Michael Sweigert, 1858–64; Rev. Henry Gathers, 1864–68; Rev. S.S. Stouffer, 1870; Rev. William E. Crebs, 1871–73; Rev. David Townsend, 1873–74; Rev. Wilson Selner, 1875–81; Rev. Elias A. Best, 1883–86; Rev. J.W. Schwartz, 1889–92; Rev. W.M. Hering, 1892–93; Rev. William J. Bucher, 1893–97; Rev. F.J. Matter, 1897–1900; Rev. Charles E. Berkey, 1900–03; Rev. W.B. Claney, 1903–10; Rev. William E. Sunday, 1910.

Methodist Episcopal Church

In 1871 the Methodists erected a substantial house of worship with a congregation largely coming from nearby Widnoon. The pastor in 1914 was Rev. John Wall.

References

Unincorporated communities in Armstrong County, Pennsylvania
Unincorporated communities in Pennsylvania